Myrciaria rojasii is a species of plant in the family Myrtaceae. It is endemic to west-central Brazil and Paraguay. It was first described in 1963 by Carlos Maria Diego Enrique Legrand.

References

rojasii
Crops originating from the Americas
Tropical fruit
Flora of South America
Fruits originating in South America
Cauliflory
Fruit trees
Berries
Plants described in 1963